Xenentodon is a genus of needlefishes native to Asia. It is one of ten genera in the family Belonidae.

Species
There are currently two recognized species in this genus:
Xenentodon cancila (F. Hamilton, 1822) (Freshwater Garfish)
Xenentodon canciloides (Bleeker, 1854)

References

Belonidae